Pattonville is a neighborhood in Baden-Württemberg, Germany, northeast of Stuttgart, with the unusual distinction of being a former United States military  housing complex, as few U.S. installations returned to German control have been maintained in their former form.

History

Pattonville was a large U.S. military housing installation in West Germany during the Cold War, built and maintained by the U.S. Army from 1955 to 1992 as part of the Stuttgart Military Community.  The community was named for General George S. Patton (1885–1945), commander of the Third Army in World War II.

Located northeast of the city and just southeast of Ludwigsburg, Pattonville was home to Stuttgart American High School from 1955 to 1992, with a peak enrollment of 1,200 during the 1960s. Former Speaker of the House Newt Gingrich and musician Katrina Leskanich of Katrina and the Waves are among the better known students of SAHS, although both graduated elsewhere. Patch American High School at Patch Barracks, southwest of Stuttgart, became the only DODEA (DoDDS) High School for the vicinity in 1992;  it closed in 2015, and the new Stuttgart High School opened that fall on Panzer Kaserne, just east of Böblingen, as the sole DODEA school in the Stuttgart Military Community.

Stuttgart Golf Club
Designed by Bernhard von Limburger, it opened in 1956, adjacent to the west, and West German locals were first allowed access in 1969.

Over time, the club allowed a limited number of German members and the club was transitioned to shared German control with the large withdrawal of U.S. Army personnel from Stuttgart and Ludwigsburg following the Gulf War; it is now known as Golf Club Neckar eV. The American Stuttgart Golf Club is operated by the U.S. Army Garrison Stuttgart Family and Morale, Welfare and Recreation Office. The golf course and club are the only remaining link to the former U.S. installation.

Closure and Redevelopment
Following the withdrawal of most Army units in the area after the Gulf War, the installation was returned to the German government. Largely a housing complex, Pattonville was opened in 1994 as apartments for the local German population, and the former Stuttgart American School complex is now in use as the Erich-Bracher-Schule. The former military airfield supports the rescue helicopter "Christoph 51", which was relocated there due to air traffic congestion at Stuttgart Airport. It has become a recreational aerodrome, with the German civilian ICAO code EDTQ.

Jurisdiction of the area had been shared by the cities of Remseck and Kornwestheim, eastern and southern neighbors of Ludwigsburg, respectively. The irregular boundary between the two cities was realigned along John-F.-Kennedy-Allee, Pattonville's central spine, so that the western half belongs to Kornwestheim, the eastern half to Remseck. Pattonville's current population of approximately 6,000 (2013) is split between the two cities. The streets, named after various U.S. states, are a reminder of the postwar American military presence.

References

External links
 Photo Tour of Redeveloped Pattonville- now a German residential area
 Stuttgart-Ludwigsburg HS Alumni Association
 DoDEA Page with Contact for Stuttgart American High School Alumni
 Facebook Interest Page for Pattonville
 WorldFlicks page for Pattonville
 Webpage detailing history of entire Stuttgart Military Community
 Stuttgart VVS Transit Map for Pattonville
 German Language Website of Golf Club Nekartal- former Pattonville Golf Course

Ludwigsburg
United States military in Stuttgart
Military installations of the United States in Germany
Cantonments